The Korres P4 is a Greek sports car designed by Korres Engineering. Korres has a goal of producing and selling 100 models to North America, the Middle East and Greece.

Specifications and performance

Engine
The Korres is powered by a 7.0 litre LS7 V8 Corvette engine which produces 505 horsepower and is capable of reaching 100km/h in 3.8 seconds with a maximum speed of 300km/h (186mph).

Transmission
The gearbox is made specifically for the car and features a 6 speed manual transmission (2.538, 1.611, 1.208, 0.933, 0.777, 0.560) with 3 transfer case ratios, normal (1:1 ratio), sports (1.62:1 ratio) and trial (5.95:1 ratio). P4 has a theoretical top speed of over 300km/h (186.4mph).

Handling
The car's suspension is made by Korres Engineering. The P4 features an adjustable ride height suspension system that can raise the car's ride height by 400mm to help it negotiate rocks and other obstacles. Generally, a low ride height means sharp steering control.

Performance

Features
 Front-to-back diagonal wheel interconnection providing both anti-roll and anti-pitch
 Cockpit adjustable ride height control
 Adjustable overall suspension stiffness when altering vehicle ride height (low=stiff, high=soft)
 Unmatched off-road capabilities (for a vehicle with 4 regular-sized wheels)
 Reliable and robust mechanical interconnection of wheels through push-rods, levers and torsion bars, without the use of electronics or hydro-pneumatic systems
 Excellent ability to absorb bumps and offer a very smooth ride and great control over extremely uneven surfaces
 Precise wheel tracking on extremely rough and uneven terrain
 Increased grip on slippery or loose surfaces
 Extremely high level of axle articulation (suspension flex, warp)
 Little roll when cornering (high roll stiffness)
 True sports car handling when fully lowered
 Sturdy vehicle dynamics
 Ultra-compact, fully synchronized, manual 6-speed gearbox
 3 different transfer case ratios, cruise (direct 1:1 ratio), sport (1.62:1 ratio) and trial (5.95:1 ratio)
 Crawl ratio of 56:1
 Centre differential with selectable All-Wheel-Drive (AWD), and 4WD (locked centre differential)
 Selectable rear-wheel drive (RWD)

On a dynamometer and in AWD, driveline losses were measured at 11%

References

External links
 www.news.gr
 youtube.com
 novascientia.net

Cars of Greece
Sports cars